Kosh-Döbö may refer to the following places in Kyrgyzstan:
Kosh-Döbö, Ak-Talaa, a village in Ak-Talaa District, Naryn Region
Kosh-Döbö, Osh, a village in Nookat District, Osh Region